is a railway station on the Shinano Railway Line in the city of  Komoro, Nagano, Japan, operated by the third-sector railway operating company Shinano Railway.

Lines
Hirahara Station is served by the 65.1 km Shinano Railway Line, and is 18.3 kilometers from the starting point of the line at Karuizawa Station.

Station layout
The station consists of one ground-level island platform serving two tracks, connected to the station building by a level crossing. The station is unattended.

Platforms

Adjacent stations

History
The station opened on 10 January 1952.

Passenger statistics
In fiscal 2011, the station was used by an average of 146 passengers daily.

Surrounding area
Mitsuoka Station

See also
 List of railway stations in Japan

References

External links

Hirahara Station 

Railway stations in Japan opened in 1952
Railway stations in Nagano Prefecture
Shinano Railway Line
Komoro, Nagano